Acropora secale is a species of branching staghorn  stony coral. It is found in shallow parts of the Indo-Pacific Ocean and the type locality is Sri Lanka. The oldest fossils found date back to the Pleistocene.

Description
Acropora secale is a colonial coral that forms low hummocks. They are cylindrical but gradually taper towards the tips. They grow in a corymbose fashion with the lower branches being longer than the upper ones so that the coral has a level-topped appearance. The corallites are of varying sizes and arranged in vertical rows, often with alternate rows of larger and smaller corallites. The skeleton is covered by a thin ectodermal layer of tissue. When feeding, the polyps protrude from the corallites. Each has a single ring of twelve tentacles, one of which is longer than the others. The polyps have a mouth which opens into the coelenteron. This interconnects with other polyps through a complex system of channels, the coenenchyme, inside the porous skeleton. Several colour schemes occur in this coral, purple with yellow tips to the branches, pale brown with blue tips, plain green or plain brown.

Distribution
Acropora secale is found in the tropical waters of the west Indo-Pacific including the coasts of East Africa, Mozambique, Rodrigues, Aldabra and Chagos. It is also found further east around Singapore, Thailand, Indonesia, Japan, the Philippines, Taiwan and north and west Australia.

Biology
Acropora secale is a zooxanthellate species of coral. This means that it has symbiotic dinoflagellates living within its tissues.  These, combined with pigments in the tissue, are responsible for the colour of the colony.

Acropora secale is a hermaphrodite and both female gonads and testes are present and mature once a year. The colonies release eggs and sperm simultaneously, usually six days after the full moon, in November in the Southern Hemisphere and in June in the Northern Hemisphere. Fertilisation is external; the developing larvae form part of the plankton and drift with the current before settling on the seabed.

References

Acropora
Animals described in 1878
Near threatened animals